The 8th Lux Style Awards ceremony was held in Expo Center in Karachi, Pakistan. The show was hosted by Ahsan Khan, Sana Nawaz and from the members of BNN. Some of the film and music categories were removed from the award.

Films

Television

Music

Fashion

References

External links

Lux Style Awards
Lux Style Awards
Lux Style Awards
Lux Style Awards
Lux
Lux
Lux